Johann Justin Preissler (1698–1771) was a German painter and draughtsman.

Biography
Preissler was born and died in Nuremberg.  According to the RKD he was the son and pupil of Johann Daniel Preissler and the brother of Georg Martin and Johan Martin. Like his father before him, he took a grand tour as a young man and travelled extensively in Italy (Venice, Florence Rome Naples).  On his return he married the glasspainter Susanna Maria Dorsch (1738). He became director of the Nuremberg Academy (founded by his father) in 1742, and in 1752 he became director of the drawing academy. His copies of the ceiling pieces by Rubens and Van Dyck in the Carolus Borromeuskerk were published by his brother Georg Martin in 1735. They form an historic record of those paintings, as lightning struck the church in 1718 and caused a fire which caused the roof to collapse. The Teylers Museum in Haarlem has a copy of this book as well as other works by Preissler.

References

Works by Johann Preissler at the Museum of New Zealand Te Papa Tongarewa
Johann Justin Preissler on Artnet

1698 births
1771 deaths
18th-century German painters
18th-century German male artists
German male painters
German draughtsmen
Artists from Nuremberg